James Miles is an American former Negro league outfielder who played in the 1930s.

Miles played for the Philadelphia Stars in 1934, and for the Chicago American Giants the following season. In 20 recorded career games, he posted 13 hits and nine RBI in 69 plate appearances.

References

External links
 and Seamheads

Year of birth missing
Place of birth missing
Chicago American Giants players
Philadelphia Stars players
Baseball outfielders